The Nohain is a river in central France. The name can also refer to the following people:
 Franc-Nohain (1872–1934), French poet (Maurice Étienne Legrand) who took his pen-name from the river.
 Jean Nohain (1900–1981), French playwright, son of Franc-Nohain.
 Dominique Nohain (1925–2017), French actor, son of Jean.